Dil Na Umeed To Nahi is a Pakistani social drama television series produced by Kashf Foundation, directed by Kashif Nisar and written by Amna Mufti. It features Yumna Zaidi, Wahaj Ali, Fajar Khan, Bonita Malik, Muhammad Sadoon and Isbah Irfan in leading roles. Focuses on several social evils including child marriages, child labour, human trafficking/sex trafficking and prostitution, the story revolves around three individuals, Allah Rakhi, Jamshaid and Naseem Zehra who face these problems.

In late February 2021, the series received notice from PEMRA. The series won rave reviews from the critics and audience for its unique storyline and great acting performances. At 21st Lux Style Awards, the series received five nominations and won Best Ensemble Play.

Plot
Allah Rakhi ( Yumna Zaidi ) is young girl lives in a village with her family but due to extreme poverty her family gets her married to a much older man who solds off her as a prostitute to a brothel where she is renamed Sumbul.

Jamshaid ( Wahaj Ali ) is a neighbor and friend of Allah Rakhi who leaves his home after facing physical violence from his mother and from his teacher in school. He runs to the city where he gets entangled in human trafficking and faces many hurdles including child labour.

Naseem Zehra ( Fajar Khan ) is a headstrong and confident girl who dreams of becoming a cricketer and winning the world cup for her country. Due to her father's stereotypical thoughts that girls cannot play cricket (which are put in his mind by his neighbor Naeem Sherwani who has impure thoughts towards Naseem) she struggles to achieve her dreams and nearly becomes a victim of human trafficking.

Years later fate intervenes, Allah Rakhi and Jamshaid cross paths with each other as full grown adults. Allah Rakhi runs away from the brothel and finds place in 'Big Brother' shelter home where Jamashaid works to help such women. At first both don't recognize each other but then some series of hints make Jamashaid recognize her as his long lost childhood friend who used to live in the same village with him.

Cast
Yumna Zaidi as Allah Rakhi aka Sumbul
Bonita Malik as young Allah Rakhi
Wahaj Ali as Jamshaid (Jimmy)
Muhammad Sadoon Ali as young Jamshaid
 Fajar Khan as Naseem Zehra
Hamna Aamir as young Naseem
 Momina Aayla Chaudhry as Hijab Zahra
 Yasra Rizvi as Savera
Nauman Ijaz as T.M
 Omair Rana as Zulfi
Samiya Mumtaz as Najma
 Naveed Shehzad as Suraiya Anjum
Adnan Shah Tipu as Ikram
Noor ul Hassan as Qazi Jaleel
Kashif Mehmood as Naeem Sherwani
Faiz Chuhan as Majeed, Allah Rakhi's father
Saima Saleem as Razia, Allah Rakhi's mother
Ismat Iqbal as Allah Rakhi's grandmother
Saba Bukhari as Sadia
 Nadia Afgan as Batool aka Batoolaan
 Raheela Agha as Malkani Ji≥
 Seemi Raheel as Zulfi's mother
 Haseeb Muhammad Bin Qasim as Doctor
 Iftikhar Iffi as Baba Ranjha

Production 
In January 2020, it reported that Yumna Zaid is starring in a caused-based serial, directed by Kashif Nisar, written by Amna Mufi and produced by Kashf Foundation. The principal photography of the series began in late 2019 in Lahore but was halted in March 2020 due to the COVID-19 pandemic. The shooting then resumed in October 2020. The serial was rejected by three mainstream channels in the country and consequently aired on TV One and PTV Home on 18 January 2021. The series's broadcast was postponed during the month of Ramadan. The writer stated in an interview that story of the series is inspired by her novel Yeh Bhi Aik Kahani Hai.

Reception 
Sadaf Hiader of DAWN Images praised the sensitive portrayal of the subject and performances of the actors including Zaidi, Rizvi, Shehzad, Rana and particularly the child actors. The News International praised the women portrayal and empathetic treatment of the characters, especially women.

Awards and nominations

 It earned TV One its first LSA win.

References

External links 
 Dil Na Umeed To Nahi at IMDb

Pakistani drama television series
2021 Pakistani television series debuts
Urdu-language television shows
2021 Pakistani television series endings